Rodrigo Antonio Cordero Solano (born 4 December 1973) is a retired  Costa Rican professional footballer.

Club career
Cordero made his debut on 4 September 1994 for second division outfit Municipal Puriscal against Uruguay de Coronado.

Nicknamed Rocky, he later played for Alajuelense, Herediano, Brujas, Cartaginés, Pérez Zeledón, Puntarenas, Ramonense before moving to second division side Barrio Mexico in summer 2010. He was a tough-tackling holding midfielder with enormous energy and determination.

International career
Cordero made his debut for Costa Rica in a friendly match against Paraguay on June 21, 2000 and has made 34 appearances for the Costa Rica national football team, including 14 qualifying matches for the 2002 FIFA World Cup. He represented his country at the 2003 UNCAF Nations Cup as well as at the 2001 Copa América and was a non-playing squad member at the 2002 World Cup.

His final international was a June 2004 friendly against Nicaragua.

Career statistics

International goals
Scores and results list. Costa Rica's goal tally first.

References

External links
 
 Perfil de jugadores de la Selección Nacional Rodrigo Cordero (2002 World Cup profile) - Nación 
 Profile at Nacion.com 

1973 births
Living people
People from San José Province
Association football midfielders
Costa Rican footballers
Costa Rica international footballers
Liga FPD players
2001 Copa América players
2002 FIFA World Cup players
2003 UNCAF Nations Cup players
L.D. Alajuelense footballers
A.D. Carmelita footballers
C.S. Herediano footballers
Brujas FC players
C.S. Cartaginés players
Municipal Pérez Zeledón footballers
A.D. Ramonense players
Copa Centroamericana-winning players